14-3-3 protein theta is a protein that in humans is encoded by the YWHAQ gene.

Function 

This gene product belongs to the 14-3-3 family of proteins that mediate signal transduction by binding to phosphoserine-containing proteins. This highly conserved protein family is found in both plants and mammals, and this protein is 99% identical to the mouse and rat orthologs. This gene is upregulated in patients with amyotrophic lateral sclerosis. It contains in its 5' UTR a 6 bp tandem repeat sequence that is polymorphic; however, there is no correlation between the repeat number and the disease.

Interactions 
YWHAQ has been shown to interact with:

 BAX, 
 BAD, 
 C-Raf, 
 CRTC2, 
 CBL 
 HDAC5, 
 MEF2D, 
 NRIP1, 
 PFKFB2, 
 PRKD1,
 PRKCZ, 
 TERT,  and
 UCP3.

References

Further reading

14-3-3 proteins